Algeria fielded six competitors at the 2009 World Championships in Athletics in Berlin.

Team selection

Results

Men

References

External links
Official competition website

Nations at the 2009 World Championships in Athletics
World Championships in Athletics
Algeria at the World Championships in Athletics